Yanaqucha (Quechua yana black, very dark, qucha lake, "black lake", hispanicized spelling Yanacocha) is a lake in the Junín Region in Peru. It is situated in the Junín Province, in the north of the Carhuamayo District, north of the mountain Yanahirka (Quechua for "black mountain", hispanicized Yanajirca).

See also
List of lakes in Peru

References

INEI, Compendio Estadistica 2007, page 26

Lakes of Peru
Lakes of Junín Region

qu:Yanaqucha (Hunin suyupi)